Academy Park may refer to:

Academic Park, Belgrade, Serbia
Academy Park (Albany, New York), United States
 Academy Park, a street in Glasgow, Scotland
Academy Park High School, Sharon Hill, Pennsylvania, United States